Arnaldo Nogueira de Novais Guedes Rebelo (11 June 1847 – 1917) was a Portuguese colonial administrator and military officer. He was born on 11 June 1847 in Vitória, a parish of Porto.

He was governor of Cape Verde between June 1900 and 1 October 1902, governor of Macau between 17 December 1902 and December 1903 and governor of Portuguese India from 8 November 1905 until 14 February 1907. He was appointed brigadier general in 1910.

See also
List of colonial governors of Cape Verde
List of governors of Macau
List of governors of Portuguese India

References

1847 births
1917 deaths
Year of death unknown
People from Porto
Colonial heads of Cape Verde
Portuguese colonial governors and administrators
Portuguese brigadier generals
19th-century Portuguese military personnel